A decoy is a person, device, or event meant to distract.

Decoy or Decoys may also refer to:

Film and television
 Decoy (1934 film), a German crime film
 Decoy (1946 film), an American film noir
 Decoy (1995 film), an action film starring Peter Weller
 The Decoy (1916 film), a silent short film directed by William Garwood
 The Decoy (1916 Mutual), a silent film directed by George Lederer
 The Decoy (1935 film), adventure film directed by Roger Le Bon and Hans Steinhoff
 The Decoy (2006 film), a western film
 Decoys (film), a 2004 science fiction horror film
 Decoy (TV series), a 1950s television series
 "Decoy" (Justified), an episode of the TV series Justified
 "Decoys", an episode of the television show Frasier

Music
 Decoy (album), a 1984 album by Miles Davis
 Decoy (EP), a 1995 EP by Good Riddance
 "Decoy", a song by Paramore

Ships
 HMS Decoy, several British Royal Navy vessels
 USS Decoy (1822), a U.S. Navy schooner
 PS Decoy, a 1986 modern sea-going paddle steamer

Other
 Decoy (chess), a tactic in chess
 Decoy cells, virally infected epithelial cells that can be found in urine
 Decoy Heath
 Boarstall Duck Decoy
 Miniature Air-Launched Decoy, a decoy missile developed by the United States